Carlo Tomasi (15 October 1930) is an Italian Argentine racing driver.

Complete 24 Hours of Le Mans results

References

Living people
Argentine racing drivers
24 Hours of Le Mans drivers
World Sportscar Championship drivers
Year of birth missing (living people)